The following articles relate to the price of energy:

Carbon price
Energy crisis
Price of oil
Gas prices (disambiguation)
Hubbert peak theory, or peak oil
Energy economics
Electricity market
Electricity pricing
Cost of electricity by source